The Sixes Hotel in Sixes, Oregon is a historic  property with a hotel building that is listed on the National Register of Historic Places.

History
In the 1840s the location of the hotel was a stagecoach stop on the old Sixes road up the Sixes River to gold placer mines in Summerville and Inman.  A saw mill was located on the property.

The building consists of two buildings that were both moved and attached together:  the house of F.L. Randall, which was moved in 1920, and a former mill workers' house, moved later.

References

Hotel buildings on the National Register of Historic Places in Oregon
Gothic Revival architecture in Oregon
Hotel buildings completed in 1918
Curry County, Oregon
Hotels in Oregon
1918 establishments in Oregon